Maison Louis Jadot (or Louis Jadot) is a winery that was founded by Louis Henry Denis Jadot in 1859. The first vineyard bought by the Jadot family is the Beaune vineyard, Clos des Ursules, in 1826. 

The family wine company produces and markets Burgundy wine. It operates both its own vineyards and buys grapes from other growers. It controls  of vineyards in Burgundy (including Beaujolais Crus), and produces only Appellation d'Origine Contrôlée (AOC) wines. 

Louis Jadot owns vineyards in the Mâconnais region: Domaine Ferret in Fuissé and Château des Jacques in Moulin à Vent within the Beaujolais region.  In 1996, Louis Jadot partnered with Tonnellerie Vicard and created its own cooperage called Cadus, in order to produce French oak barrels crafted in the Burgundian tradition.

References

External links

Louis Jadot homepage (English)

Jadot
1859 establishments in France